Cedric Rudolph Bozeman (born March 7, 1983) is an American professional basketball player for Link Tochigi Brex of the B.League.

Early life
Born in Los Angeles, California, Bozeman attended Mater Dei High School in Santa Ana alongside Jamal Sampson and USC Heisman Trophy winner, Matt Leinart.  He was a member of the high school's top-ranked Mater Dei Monarchs basketball team. Bozeman later played college basketball with the UCLA Bruins.

During his Freshman year, he played In 26 games (21 starts). Was a Honorable-Mention Pac-10 All-Freshman Team Selection after averaging 3.5 assists per game (8th In Pac-10), At The Ucla Basketball Banquet Awards He Won The Seymour Armond Memorial Award As The Most Valuable Freshman. As A Junior, He Started All 28 Games, and Led The Pac-10 In assists per game (5.5) and assists (155), at the end of the year banquet, he was given the bruin hoopsters jd morgan memorial award for outstanding team play.

Professional career
Bozeman was not drafted in the NBA, but found his way into the league through the Atlanta Hawks where he averaged 1.1 points in 23 games with five starts before being waived in January 2007. Soon thereafter he was quickly picked up by the Albuquerque Thunderbirds of the NBA D-League. Bozeman went overseas to play for the Belgium-based Telindus Oostende basketball club and averaged 4.6 points per game over ten games.  The former Bruin went on to play another season in Europe, this time with the Polish Czarni Słupsk club during the 2007–08 season.

In 2010, he signed with Belgacom Liège in Belgium.

For the 2011–12 season, Bozeman joined the Reno Bighorns of the NBDL. At the end of December 2011, the Bighorns waived Bozeman due to injury. However, he later rejoined the team.
In 2012, he joined the Barangay Ginebra Kings of Philippine Basketball Association as their import for the Governors Cup. Later in 2012, he signed with the Westports Malaysia Dragons.

From 2013 to 2015, Bozeman played with the Toshiba Brave Thunders Kanagawa of the Japanese NBL where he won a championship in the 2013–14 season.

Career statistics

NBA

|-
| align="left" | 2006–07
| align="left" | Atlanta
| 23 || 5 || 8.7 || .282 || .154 || .333 || 1.0 || 0.4 || 0.2 || 0.1 || 1.1
|}

College

|-
| align="left" | 2001–02
| align="left" | UCLA
| 26 || 21 || 23.4 || .413 || .280 || .286 || 2.5 || 3.5 || 0.2 || 0.1 || 4.0
|-
| align="left" | 2002–03
| align="left" | UCLA
| 21 || 17 || 26.0 || .408 || .313 || .514 || 3.0 || 3.2 || 0.8 || 0.0 || 7.3
|-
| align="left" | 2003–04
| align="left" | UCLA
| 28 || 28 || 33.7 || .413 || .222 || .554 || 3.8 || 5.5 || 0.6 || 0.1 || 7.5
|-
| align="left" | 2005–06
| align="left" | UCLA
| 31 || 30 || 27.4 || .500 || .393 || .776 || 3.3 || 2.3 || 0.9 || 0.1 || 7.6
|- class="sortbottom"
| style="text-align:center;" colspan="2"| Career
| 106 || 96 || 27.8 || .435 || .321 || .584 || 3.2 || 3.6 || 0.6 || 0.1 || 6.6
|}

References

External links

 
UCLA Bruins player profile
Toshiba Brave Thunders
Article in Japan Times
Highlights video

1983 births
Living people
African-American basketball players
Albuquerque Thunderbirds players
American expatriate basketball people in Belgium
American expatriate basketball people in China
American expatriate basketball people in Japan
American expatriate basketball people in Malaysia
American expatriate basketball people in the Philippines
American expatriate basketball people in Poland
American men's basketball players
Anaheim Arsenal players
Atlanta Hawks players
Barangay Ginebra San Miguel players
Basketball players from California
BC Oostende players
Beijing Ducks players
Czarni Słupsk players
Fukushima Firebonds players
Kawasaki Brave Thunders players
Liège Basket players
Utsunomiya Brex players
Maine Red Claws players
McDonald's High School All-Americans
Parade High School All-Americans (boys' basketball)
Philippine Basketball Association imports
Reno Bighorns players
Shooting guards
Small forwards
UCLA Bruins men's basketball players
Undrafted National Basketball Association players
Kuala Lumpur Dragons players
Sportspeople from Santa Ana, California
21st-century African-American sportspeople
20th-century African-American people